The Nobyuki Abe Cabinet is the 36th Cabinet of Japan led by Nobuyuki Abe from August 30, 1939, to January 16, 1940.

Cabinet

References 

Cabinet of Japan
1939 establishments in Japan
Cabinets established in 1939
Cabinets disestablished in 1940